Amadéus Leopold (born 3 August 1988) is an American classical music artist.

Early life and education

Born Hanbin Yoo in Seoul, Leopold began playing the violin at age five and made his orchestral debut five years later with the Seoul Philharmonic. He immigrated to the U.S. at age 11 and made his international debut the following year in Los Angeles at the 42nd Annual Grammy Awards as the solo performer chosen to honor Isaac Stern. He was subsequently awarded the loan of Giuseppe Guarneri del Gesu from the Stradivari Society of Chicago and made his concerto debut appearances with the Pacific Symphony and the San Diego Symphony in Southern California. He attended middle school at the Crossroads School in Santa Monica while taking violin lessons with Robert Lipsett at The Colburn School.

Leopold began his studies in New York at age 13 with Itzhak Perlman through The Perlman Music Program. At 14, he recorded a recital disc titled Haze for Universal Music Korea, featuring works for violin and piano by Arvo Pärt, Leoš Janáček, and Francis Poulenc. He attended Professional Children's School in Manhattan and continued his studies with Itzhak Perlman at The Juilliard School until 2009. As first-prize winner at the 49th Annual Young Concert Artists International Auditions, he made his New York recital debut at Zankel Hall in October 2009.

Leopold adopted his current name in 2012, having been previously billed as Hahn-Bin.

Solo classical performances
 Grammy Awards, 42nd Annual Grammy Awards, Salute to Classical Music honoring Isaac Stern (2000)
 Musée du Louvre, Auditorium du Louvre (2008)
 Carnegie Hall, Zankel Hall (2009)
 The Kennedy Center, Terrace Theater (2009)
 The Museum of Modern Art, Soliloquy for Andy Warhol (2011)
 Carnegie Hall, Isaac Stern Auditorium, New York Youth Symphony (2011)
 The Stone, Presented by Lou Reed and Laurie Anderson (2011)
 Hammer Museum, Billy Wilder Theater (2011)
 The Museum of Modern Art, The Atrium, Tzigane (2011)
 Seattle Symphony, Benaroya Hall, Tchaikovsky Violin Concerto (2012) 
 Lincoln Center, Orchestra of St. Lukes, Alice Tully Hall (2012)
 LongLake Festival Lugano, Palazzo dei Congressi, Switzerland (2012)
 Latitude Festival, Presented by Royal Albert Hall, U.K. (2012)
 Melbourne Festival, Melbourne Recital Centre, Australia (2012)
 UCLA, Center for the Art of Performance, Royce Hall (2013)
 Southbank Centre, Yoko Ono's Meltdown Festival, Queen Elizabeth Hall (2013)

References

External links 

1988 births
Living people
Juilliard School alumni
Child classical musicians
People from Seoul
South Korean emigrants to the United States
American classical violinists
Male classical violinists
American male violinists
American classical musicians of Korean descent
Crossroads School alumni
21st-century classical violinists
21st-century American male musicians
21st-century American violinists